is a member of the Japanese Communist Party serving as member of the House of Councillors from Tokyo, where he was elected with 10.7% of the vote in 2016. He was educated at the University of Tokyo and at Waseda Law School, in 2007 and 2010 respectively. In 2010, he passed the National Bar Examination and became a lawyer in 2011. During his time as a lawyer, he represented workers that worked at the Fukushima Daiichi Nuclear Power Plant. Yamazoe is a supporter of LGBT rights.

Railway incident 

On 16 September 2021, police accused Yamazoe, who is a railway photography enthusiast, of having trespassed on the Chichibu Main Line on 3 November 2020. The case was ultimately dropped on 30  September 2021. The subsequent media coverage and handling of the case by the police made several media outlets speculate whether the disproportionate reportage was due to the political affiliation of Yamazoe and the medias' perception of opposition parties like the JCP.

References

1984 births
Living people
People from Kyoto Prefecture
21st-century Japanese lawyers
Japanese communists
Japanese Communist Party politicians
Japanese LGBT rights activists